Fritz Luty (1928 – 11 September 2017) was an American physicist.

He was born in Essen, Germany, and briefly saw action as a teenager in the German Army towards the end of World War II. He then studied physics and was awarded a PhD by the University of Göttingen. After working as an Assistant Professor in Stuttgart he moved in 1965 to the US to be a full professor at the University of Utah, where he subsequently spent his whole career. 

He was elected a Fellow of the American Physical Society in 1972. 

He was married with two sons.

References

1928 births
2017 deaths
University of Utah faculty
21st-century American physicists
Fellows of the American Physical Society